Flopsy is a common name for pet rabbits, but may specifically refer to:
 Flopsy, a fictional rabbit character in The Tale of Peter Rabbit by Beatrix Potter and mother of the Flopsy Bunnies
 Flopsy Fish, a villain in the Mario series of computer games. 
 Flopsy, a midget slave character in This Toilet Earth, an album by GWAR.
 Flopsie, King Bumi's pet gorilla-goat on Avatar: The Last Airbender